Roger John Liddle, Baron Liddle (born 14 June 1947) is a British political adviser and consultant who is principally known for being Special Adviser on European matters to the former Prime Minister Tony Blair, and President of the European Commission, José Manuel Barroso. He also worked together with Peter Mandelson on books outlining the political philosophy of the Labour Party under Blair's leadership. He is the co-chair of the international think tank Policy Network and was Pro-Chancellor of the University of Lancaster until 2020.

Family
Liddle was the son of John Thwaites Liddle and Elizabeth  Temple. Born on 14 June 1947 in Carlisle, he attended Carlisle Grammar School. and gained the Wyndham Scholarship at The Queen's College, Oxford, where he gained degrees in Modern History and Management Studies. In 1983 he married the Hon. Caroline Thomson – daughter of Lord Thomson of Monifieth, former Labour Member of Parliament for Dundee East. She was chief operating officer of the BBC, until she was made redundant in 2011 amidst controversy over the selection of a new BBC Director General.

Career
After completing his degrees Liddle worked in research for the Oxford School of Social and Administrative Studies and as an industrial relations Officer for The Electricity Council. In 1976 he moved into politics by becoming Special Adviser to William Rodgers, Secretary of State for Transport.

From there he became Director of the Public Policy Centre, undertaking pioneering work on the regulation of privatised industries, exchange rate policy, regional policy, science and industrial policy, employee participation and wage determination, and choice in public services.

Liddle then moved into the private sector for 10 years, taking the position of managing director of Prima Europe Ltd – a consultancy company advising on the impact of politics and regulation at European and national level.

Government
In 1997 he moved back into politics to become Special Adviser on European matters to Prime Minister Tony Blair. During a seven-year spell in this role he developed a new UK policy of positive engagement in the European Union, focusing on economic reform, innovation and enterprise promotion; modernisation of Welfare States and labour market reform; as well as institutional issues, the Constitutional Treaty, and European Defence. He was also responsible for liaison with business and trade unions on European issues.

Advancing from Number 10, he became a Member of the Cabinet of the European Union Trade Commissioner, where he advised on EU policy and their impact on the UK. In 2006 he moved on to become Principal Adviser to the President of the European Commission, leading a team of economists and experts in the Bureau of European Policy Advisers advising on the economic and social challenges facing Europe.

Liddle is currently chairman of Policy Network – an international think tank bringing together academics, policymakers and politicians across the progressive centre left; responsible for major projects on the future of the European Social Model, public service reform, immigration and integration, flexicurity, and globalisation and social justice. He is a visiting fellow of the European Institute at the London School of Economics.

He is also former chair of the UK government's New Industry, New Jobs, Universities and Skills advisory panel, which reported directly to Lord Mandelson, who was then Secretary of State for Business, Innovation and Skills.

Peerage

It was announced that Liddle would be awarded a peerage in the 2010 Dissolution Honours List. He was created a life peer on 19 June 2010 as Baron Liddle, of Carlisle in the County of Cumbria, and was introduced in the House of Lords on 21 June 2010, supported by Lord Mandelson and Lord Rodgers of Quarry Bank.

Political approach
Liddle has also played a direct role in elected politics, as a councillor on Oxford City Council and Lambeth London Borough Council. In 2013 he was elected to Cumbria County Council for the Wigton Division. He was a founding member of the Social Democratic Party in 1981 and a member of the party's national committee until 1986, during which time he contested a number of parliamentary seats, including the 1986 Fulham byelection.

Liddle has written four books, all focusing firmly on European issues. Most recently Global Europe, Social Europe with Anthony Giddens and Patrick Diamond. Together with Peter Mandelson he wrote The Blair Revolution: Can New Labour Deliver? in 1996. His thoughts on the future of Europe, made during his time in the Commission, were published in a Fabian Ideas pamphlet in 2005.

He became a member of the Labour Party associated Progress strategy board in 2017.

Publications
 Challenging the politics of evasion: the only way to renew European social democracy, Policy Network, December 2009, 
 After the crisis: A new socio-economic settlement for the EU, Policy Network, November 2009.
 Beyond New Labour: the future of social democracy in Britain, Politicos, 2009. 
 Building a low-carbon future: the politics of climate change, Policy Network, June 2007 
 Social pessimism: the new social reality of Europe, Policy Network, October 2008. 
 Progressive governance 2008: the path to a global progressive consensus, April 2008 
 Creating a culture of fairness: a progressive response to income inequality in Britain, January 2008 
 A new social Europe, September 2007 
 The social reality of Europe, March 2007 
 Global Europe Social Europe, October 2006 
 Economic Reform in Europe: Priorities for the next five years, November 2004

References

External links 
 
 Policy Network

1947 births
British writers
Councillors in the London Borough of Lambeth
Labour Party (UK) life peers
Life peers created by Elizabeth II
Labour Party (UK) councillors
Living people
People educated at Carlisle Grammar School
Members of Oxford City Council
Members of Cumbria County Council
Social Democratic Party (UK) politicians
Alumni of The Queen's College, Oxford
British political consultants
People from Carlisle, Cumbria